Port Elizabeth is a town located on the island of Bequia, which is part of the Grenadines island chain. It is the capital of Grenadines Parish.

References

Populated places in Saint Vincent and the Grenadines